Jean-Pascal Lacoste (also known as Jean-Pascal or Jipé; born 21 June 1978) is a French television personality, TV host and former singer and actor.

Career
In 2001, he participated in the first edition of French TV reality show Star Academy, but was eliminated on 5 January 2002. He was semi-finalist and participated in the Star Academy Tour. He remained famous for his quarrels with Jenifer Bartoli.

After his participation, he released his singles "L'Agitateur" (#2 in France, #1 in Belgium) and "Rue de la liberté" (#13 in France, #3 in Belgium) and his debut album Jean-Pascal, qui es-tu ? (#7 in France, #1 in Belgium).

In June 2002, he became a TV host in a sport program Tous ensemble, then in a Incroyable mais vrai !, along with Bruno Roblès, Roger Pierre et Sophie Favier, on TF1.

In 2006, he started a career as actor in the police series Section de recherches.

In January 2007, he participated in the "Grand Concours des Animateurs", hosted by Carole Rousseau.

In 2008, he has hosted various TV shows on NRJ 12.

Personal life
He married Jennifer Jacobs in early 2007 and became Kylie's father on 29 March 2008. In 2014, Jean-Pascal and Jennifer divorced.

Discography

Albums
 2002 : Jean-Pascal, qui es-tu ? – #1 in Belgium, #7 in France, #61 in Switzerland
 2003 : Plein sud – #12 in Belgium, #42 in France

Singles
 2002 : "L'Agitateur" – #1 in Belgium, #2 in France
 2002 : "Rue de la liberté" – #3 in Belgium, #13 in France
 2002 : "La chanson con" – #22 in Belgium, #17 in France

Filmography

Contestant

TV Series actor

References

Living people
1978 births
French television personalities
French television presenters
French male television actors
Male actors from Toulouse
21st-century French singers
21st-century French male singers
Star Academy (France) participants